The Compagnie générale transaérienne (CGT: General Trans-Air Company) was a predecessor of Air France, founded in 1909. At first it operated airships in France and Switzerland, then added float planes and direct flights from Paris to London. It was the first private company to operate an airplane service. After World War I (1914–18) the company faced mounting competition, and in 1921 it was absorbed by a rival.

Foundation

Louis Blériot registered the statutes of the Compagnie Générale Trans-aérienne (CGT) on 10 October 1909.
It was the first French airline, and the first of the companies that would eventually merge to become Air France.
The Compagnie générale transaérienne was the second civil airline founded in Europe, and was owned by Henri Deutsch de la Meurthe.
The privately owned company would operate airships and, for the first time in the world, airplanes.
The engineer Frédéric Airault became the technical director of the airline.

Operations

CGT built facilities for creating hydrogen gas at Nancy, where the dirigible Ville-de-Nancy was flown at the 1909 Exposition Internationale de l'Est de la France, and then at Beauval. It began offering pleasure trips at Pau, Pyrénées-Atlantiques, and then Lucerne.
CGT operated rigid airships made by Société Astra to fly in France and Switzerland.
The company then started operating seaplane service in Switzerland on lakes Lucerne and Geneva.

On 12 April 1911 Pierre Prier, chief pilot of the Blériot school in London, made the first flight from Paris (Issy-les-Moulineaux) to London (Hendon).
This was the first non-stop air service between London and Paris.
Prier flew a Blériot monoplane with a 50-horsepower Gnome engine, and made the trip in three hours and fifty six minutes.
CGT then began weekly return flights between London to Paris from April to October each year.
They carried mail and small items such as catalogs and pieces of machinery.
On 22 March 1913 GGT started the world's first scheduled passenger-carrying flights, operating at least one Astra CM Hydro-avion from Cannes to Nice. 
Two passengers could be carried. On 29 March 1913, the service was extended to Monte Carlo.
Henri Deutsch de la Meurthe was interested in establishing a hydroplane station at Arcachon.
On 15 April 1913 Gabriel Arnaud, director of CGT, visited Arcachon to study organization of a local aerospace committee. The project was dropped with the outbreak of World War I the next year.

With the end of World War I (1914–18) many planes and pilots became available, and numerous airlines were founded.
By 1920 CGT faced competition on the London-Paris route from the Lignes Aériennes Farman, several British companies, the Dutch KLM and a new French company, the Compagnie des Messageries Aériennes (CMA).
CMA had been founded in February 1919, with shareholders Louis Charles Breguet, Louis Blériot, Louis Renault and René Caudron.
It flew Breguet 14 planes equipped to carry passengers from Paris (Le Bourget) to London (Croydon).
CGT acquired seven Nieuport-Delage NiD 30 biplanes which it put into service on the Le Bourget to Croydon route in September 1920. The flight took two hours and fifteen minutes. After several accidents, in February 1921 CGT cancelled the service, which was taken over by CMA.
CMA absorbed CGT in 1921 so that it could add postal service to its offerings.
CMA and other companies would eventually merge to create Air France.

References

Sources

Defunct airlines of France
Airlines established in 1909
Airlines disestablished in 1921
Air France–KLM
Companies based in Paris
French companies established in 1909
1921 disestablishments in France